Shefali Rana is an Indian television and film actress. She is best known for her role of Asha in the television series Mariam Khan - Reporting Live.

Career 

Rana played the role of Ranveer's aunt in the series Ek Vivah Aisa Bhi.

She also played the role of Gayatri in the 2018 film Nanu Ki Jaanu.

She also had roles in the Hindi television serials Balika Vadhu, Ishq Subhan Allah, as tabassum, Peehar, Kitani Mohabbat Hai, Dharti Ki Goad Mein,Y.A.R.O Ka Tashan, Wo Teri Bhabhi Hai Pagle, Tedhi Medhi Family, Ajab Gajab Ghar Jamai, AadhaFull as beauty aunty, Doli Armano Ki and Choti Sarrdaarni, Gudiya Hamari Sabhi Pe Bhari,  Haiwaan : The Monster Ghar Ek Mandir- Kripa Agrasen Maharaja Ki,  Iss Pyaar Ko Kya Naam Doon? Ek Baar Phir as mangla, Ssshhhh...Koi Hai, Maddam Sir as fake Pushpa Singh

Personal life

Rana is from Delhi. Her mother is also an Indian television and film actress.

References

Indian television actresses
Living people
Year of birth missing (living people)